HMS Thule was a British submarine of the third group of the T class. She was built as P325 at Devonport Dockyard, and launched on 22 October 1942. So far she has been the only ship of the Royal Navy to bear the name Thule, after Thule, the mythological name for a northern island.

Service

Thule served in the Far East for much of her wartime career, where she sank thirteen junks, two lighters and five sampans with gunfire in the Strait of Malacca in a twelve-day period between 17 December 1944 to 29 December 1944. She went on to sink a further five sailing vessels and three coasters, as well as laying a number of mines.

She survived the war and continued in service with the Navy. In May 1951, Thule was sent to Canada to train with the Royal Canadian Navy.

On 18 November 1960, Thule, a member of the 5th Submarine Squadron, was taking part in an anti-submarine exercise off Portland Bill, when she was accidentally rammed by the Royal Fleet Auxiliary tanker  when at periscope depth. Thules snort was broken, one of her periscopes was bent and her casing was damaged. The submarine was scrapped at Thos. W. Ward, Inverkeithing on 14 September 1962.

Her first commander, Alastair Mars, wrote HMS Thule Intercepts, about her operations from commissioning in Scotland to the end of the war in Australia.

References

Notes

Sources
 
 
 

 

British T-class submarines of the Royal Navy
Ships built in Plymouth, Devon
1942 ships
World War II submarines of the United Kingdom
Cold War submarines of the United Kingdom